Apple is a given name, nickname, and surname. People and fictional characters with the name include:

People with the given name 
 Apple Hong, Malaysian actress and singer
 Apple Martin, the daughter of Chris Martin and Gwyneth Paltrow
 Apple Pope, American rugby league player

Fictional characters with the given name
 Apple Wilson, a character in the Canadian animated series Mother Up!
 Apple White, a character from Ever After High

People with the nickname 
 Constance Applebee (1873–1981), known as "the Apple", best known for introducing field hockey to the United States
 Ken Green (basketball, born 1959), American athlete
 A. T. Sanders Jr. (1926–1989), American politician

People with the surname 
 Adam Apple (1831–1905), American politician and farmer
 Andrew O. Apple (1845–1890), American Civil War soldier and Medal of Honor recipient
 Billy Apple (1935–2021), New Zealand artist
 Chris Apple (born 1970), American professional soccer player and coach
 David J. Apple (1941–2011), American ophthalmologist, pathologist, biographer and medical historian  
 Eli Apple (born 1995), American National Football League player
 Erik Apple (born 1977), American professional mixed martial arts fighter
 Fiona Apple (born 1977), Grammy award-winning American singer-songwriter
 Heather Elizabeth Apple (born 1948), Canadian writer, artist, and educator
 Jupiter Apple (1968–2015), Brazilian singer-songwriter and musicist
 Max Apple (born 1941), American author and academic
 Michael Apple  (born 1942), American critical educational theorist
 Pat Apple (born 1957), American politician
 R. W. Apple Jr. (1934–2006), associate editor at The New York Times
 Raymond Apple (rabbi) (born 1935), former Senior Rabbi of the Great Synagogue of Sydney, Australia

See also 
 
 
 Apfel, a surname
 Appel (disambiguation)
 Appell, a surname
 Apple (disambiguation)
 Candy Apples (born 1976), American pornographic actress

Lists of people by nickname
English unisex given names